is the sixth single released by Uverworld under the gr8! records label. The single was released on November 15, 2006 in two different formats, CD only and CD+DVD.

Overview
Released over three months after their previous single Shamrock, Kimi no Suki na Uta was the last single to be released before the release of the band's second album. The title song was used as the theme song for the TBS drama Koisuru Hanikami from October 2006 to December 2006.

Track listing

CD Format
 "" (TAKUYA∞) — 4:18
 "Extreme" (TAKUYA∞) — 2:55
 " (acoustic version)" (TAKUYA∞, Alice ice) — 5:05

CD+DVD Format

CD Portion
 "" (TAKUYA∞) — 4:18
 "Extreme" (TAKUYA∞) — 2:55
 " (acoustic version)" (TAKUYA∞, Alice ice) — 5:05

DVD Portion
 "2006 Tour Documentary"

Personnel
 TAKUYA∞ — vocals, rap, programming
 Katsuya — guitar, programming
 Akira — guitar, programming
 Nobuto — bass guitar
 Shintarou — drums

Ranking
Oricon Sales Chart (Japan)

References

2006 singles
Uverworld songs
Gr8! Records singles